Nikolai Helk (25 February 1886 in Laiuse Kirikuküla, Jõgeva Parish, Kreis Dorpat – 14 May 1941 in Tallinn) was an Estonian Major General Judge Advocate and President of the Supreme Military Tribunal between 1935 and 1940. He was executed by the Soviet occupation forces on 14 May 1941.

References 

1886 births
1941 deaths
People from Jõgeva Parish
People from Kreis Dorpat
Eastern Orthodox Christians from Estonia
Estonian major generals
Imperial Russian Army officers
Russian military personnel of World War I
Recipients of the Military Order of the Cross of the Eagle, Class II
Recipients of the Military Order of the Cross of the Eagle, Class III
Recipients of the Order of Lāčplēsis, 3rd class
Estonian people executed by the Soviet Union